Subclytia is a genus of flies in the family Tachinidae.

Species
S. rotundiventris (Fallén, 1820)

References

Phasiinae
Diptera of Europe
Tachinidae genera
Taxa named by Louis Pandellé